Bromsgrove District Council elections are held every four years. Bromsgrove District Council is the local authority for the non-metropolitan district of Bromsgrove in Worcestershire, England. Since the last boundary changes in 2015, 31 councillors are elected from 30 wards.

Political control
The first elections to the council were held in 1973, initially operating as a shadow authority before coming into its powers on 1 April 1974. Political control of the council since 1974 has been held by the following parties:

Leadership
The leaders of the council since 1995 have been:

Council elections
1973 Bromsgrove District Council election
1976 Bromsgrove District Council election
1979 Bromsgrove District Council election (New ward boundaries)
1983 Bromsgrove District Council election
1987 Bromsgrove District Council election
1991 Bromsgrove District Council election
1995 Bromsgrove District Council election (New ward boundaries & district boundary changes also took place)
1999 Bromsgrove District Council election - Conservative 30, Labour 7, Others 2
2003 Bromsgrove District Council election (New ward boundaries) - Conservative 26, Labour 8, Residents Association 4, Independent 1
2007 Bromsgrove District Council election - Conservative 26, Labour 6, Residents Association 2, Liberal Democrat 1, Others 4
2011 Bromsgrove District Council election
2015 Bromsgrove District Council election (New ward boundaries)
2019 Bromsgrove District Council election

By-election results

1995-1999

1999-2003

2003-2007

2007-2011

2015-2019

References

By-election results

External links
Bromsgrove District Council

 
Council elections in Worcestershire
District council elections in England
Council elections in Hereford and Worcester